HD 151613 is a binary star system in the northern circumpolar constellation of Draco. It is visible to the naked eye with an apparent visual magnitude of 4.84. It is moving closer to the Earth with a heliocentric radial velocity of −2 km/s.

This is a single-lined spectroscopic binary system with an orbital period of 363.57 days and an eccentricity of 0.35. The system is a source of X-ray emission. The visible component is an F-type main-sequence star with a stellar classification of F2 V. It is around 2.3 billion years old with a projected rotational velocity of 48 km/s.

References

F-type main-sequence stars
Spectroscopic binaries
Draco (constellation)
Durchmusterung objects
9578
151613
082020
6237